Shéhérazade is the title of two works by the French composer Maurice Ravel. Both have their origins in the composer's fascination with Scheherazade, the heroine and narrator of The Arabian Nights. The first work, an overture (1898), Ravel's earliest surviving orchestral piece, was not well received at its premiere and has not subsequently been among his most popular works. Four years later he had a much greater success with a song cycle with the same title, which has remained a standard repertoire piece and has been recorded many times.

Both settings are influenced by Russian composers, particularly Rimsky-Korsakov, who had written a Scheherazade in 1888. The first composition was heavily influenced by Russian music, the second used a text inspired by Rimsky-Korsakov's symphonic poem. The musical relation between the overture and the song cycle is tenuous.

Shéhérazade overture
, written in 1898 but unpublished during the composer's lifetime (it was only published in 1975), is a work for orchestra planned as the overture for an opera of the same name.

It was first performed at a concert of the Société Nationale de Musique on 27 May 1899, conducted by the composer. It had a mixed reception, with boos mingling with applause from the audience, and unflattering reviews from the critics. One described the piece as "a jolting debut: a clumsy plagiarism of the Russian School" and called Ravel a "mediocrely gifted debutant... who will perhaps become something if not someone in about ten years, if he works hard." This critic was "Willy", Henri Gauthier-Villars, who later became an admirer of Ravel. The composer assimilated Willy's criticism, describing the overture as "a clumsy botch-up", and recognising that it was "quite heavily dominated by the influence of Russian music" (assez fortement dominé par l'influence de la musique russe). Another critic, Pierre Lalo, thought that Ravel showed talent, but was too indebted to Debussy and should instead emulate Beethoven.

A programme note for the first performance, unsigned, but thought to be by the composer, reads:

The playing time of the piece is about 13 minutes.

Shéhérazade song cycle
The exoticism of the Arabian Nights continued to interest Ravel. In the early years of the 20th century he met the poet Tristan Klingsor, who had recently published a collection of  free-verse poems under the title Shéhérazade, inspired by  Rimsky-Korsakov's symphonic suite of the same name, a work that Ravel also much admired. Ravel and Klingsor were fellow members of a group of young creative artists calling themselves "Les Apaches" (the Hooligans); the poet read some of his new verses to the group, and Ravel was immediately taken with the idea of setting three of them. He asked Klingsor to make some minor changes before he set to work on the music.

Ravel's song cycle Shéhérazade, was composed for soprano solo and orchestra, setting the words of Klingsor's "", "", and "". It was first performed on 17 May 1904 at a Société Nationale concert at the Salle Nouveau Théâtre, Paris, with soprano Jeanne Hatto and an orchestra conducted by Alfred Cortot. The three songs of the cycle are individually dedicated by the composer to Jeanne Hatto ("Asie"), Madame René de Saint-Marceaux ("La flûte enchantée") and Emma Bardac ("L'indifférent").

Whether the overture and the song cycle are musically related is debated. According to Ravel's biographer Arbie Orenstein, there is little melodic connection between the overture and the cycle, with the exception of the opening theme of the first song, "Asie", which uses a theme, based on a modally inflected scale, similar to one near the beginning of the overture. Ravel originally conceived the cycle with "Asie" coming last, and this order was adopted at the premiere,  but his final preference, in the published score, gives a sequence steadily decreasing in intensity; the critic Caroline Rae writes that the music moves "from rich voluptuousness and gentle lyricism to languid sensuousness".

Asie
The first, and longest, song of the three is in the dark key of E flat minor. It typically lasts ten minutes in performance. It is, in Rae's words, "a panorama of oriental fantasy evoking Arabia, India and, at a dramatic climax, China." With the continually repeated words "je voudrais voir…" ("I should like to see…" or "I want to see…"), the poet, or his imagined speaker, dreams of escape from quotidian life into a European fantasy of Asian enticements. The music increases in intensity as his imaginations become more feverish, until subsiding to end placidly, back in the real world.

Asie, Asie, Asie,
Vieux pays merveilleux des contes de nourrice
Où dort la fantaisie comme une impératrice,
En sa forêt tout emplie de mystère.
Asie, je voudrais m'en aller avec la goëlette
Qui se berce ce soir dans le port
Mystérieuse et solitaire,
Et qui déploie enfin ses voiles violettes
Comme un immense oiseau de nuit dans le ciel d'or.
Je voudrais m'en aller vers des îles de fleurs,
En écoutant chanter la mer perverse
Sur un vieux rythme ensorceleur.
Je voudrais voir Damas et les villes de Perse
Avec les minarets légers dans l'air.
Je voudrais voir de beaux turbans de soie
Sur des visages noirs aux dents claires;
Je voudrais voir des yeux sombres d'amour
Et des prunelles brillantes de joie
En des peaux jaunes comme des oranges;
Je voudrais voir des vêtements de velours
Et des habits à longues franges.
Je voudrais voir des calumets entre des bouches
Tout entourées de barbe blanche;
Je voudrais voir d'âpres marchands aux regards louches,
Et des cadis, et des vizirs
Qui du seul mouvement de leur doigt qui se penche
Accordent vie ou mort au gré de leur désir.
Je voudrais voir la Perse, et l'Inde, et puis la Chine,
Les mandarins ventrus sous les ombrelles,
Et les princesses aux mains fines,
Et les lettrés qui se querellent
Sur la poésie et sur la beauté;
Je voudrais m'attarder au palais enchanté
Et comme un voyageur étranger
Contempler à loisir des paysages peints
Sur des étoffes en des cadres de sapin,
Avec un personnage au milieu d'un verger;
Je voudrais voir des assassins souriants
Du bourreau qui coupe un cou d'innocent
Avec son grand sabre courbé d'Orient.
Je voudrais voir des pauvres et des reines;
Je voudrais voir des roses et du sang;
Je voudrais voir mourir d'amour ou bien de haine.
Et puis m'en revenir plus tard
Narrer mon aventure aux curieux de rêves
En élevant comme Sindbad ma vieille tasse arabe
De temps en temps jusqu'à mes lèvres
Pour interrompre le conte avec art. . . .Asia, Asia, Asia!
Ancient, wonderful land of nursery stories
Where fantasy sleeps like an empress,
In her forest filled with mystery.
Asia, I want to sail away on the schooner
That rides in the harbour this evening
Mysterious and solitary,
And finally unfurls purple sails
Like a vast nocturnal bird in the golden sky.
I want to sail away to the islands of flowers,
Listening to the perverse sea singing
To an old bewitching rhythm.
I want to see Damascus and the cities of Persia
With their slender minarets in the air.
I want to see beautiful turbans of silk
Over dark faces with gleaming teeth;
I want to see dark amorous eyes
And pupils sparkling with joy
In skins as yellow as oranges;
I want to see velvet cloaks
And robes with long fringes.
I want to see long pipes in lips
Fringed round by white beards;
I want to see crafty merchants with suspicious glances,
And cadis and viziers
Who with one movement of their bending finger
Decree life or death, at whim.
I want to see Persia, and India, and then China,
Pot-bellied mandarins under their umbrellas,
Princesses with delicate hands,
And scholars arguing
About poetry and beauty;
I want to linger in the enchanted palace
And like a foreign traveller
Contemplate at leisure landscapes painted
On cloth in pinewood frames,
With a figure in the middle of an orchard;
I want to see murderers smiling
While the executioner cuts off an innocent head
With his great curved Oriental sabre.
I want to see paupers and queens;
I want to see roses and blood;
I want to see those who die for love or, better, for hatred.
And then to return home later
To tell my adventure to people interested in dreams
Raising – like Sinbad – my old Arab cup
From time to time to my lips
To interrupt the narrative artfully…

La flûte enchantée
In this song, a young slave girl tending her sleeping master, hears her lover playing his flute outside. The music, a mixture of sad and joyful, seems to her like a kiss flying to her from her beloved. The flute melody is marked by the use of the Phrygian mode.

L'ombre est douce et mon maître dort
Coiffé d'un bonnet conique de soie
Et son long nez jaune en sa barbe blanche.
Mais moi, je suis éveillée encore
Et j'écoute au dehors
Une chanson de flûte où s'épanche
Tour à tour la tristesse ou la joie.
Un air tour à tour langoureux ou frivole
Que mon amoureux chéri joue,
Et quand je m'approche de la croisée
Il me semble que chaque note s'envole
De la flûte vers ma joue
Comme un mystérieux baiser.The shade is pleasant and my master sleeps
In his conical silk hat
With his long, yellow nose in his white beard.
But I am still awake
And from outside I listen to
A flute song, pouring out
By turns, sadness and joy.
A tune by turns languorous and carefree
Which my dear lover is playing,
And when I approach the lattice window
It seems to me that each note flies
From the flute to my cheek
Like a mysterious kiss.

L'indifférent
The final song of the cycle has prompted much speculation. The poet, or his imaginary speaker, is much taken with the charms of an androgynous youth, but fails to persuade him to come into his – or her – house to drink wine. It is not clear whether the boy's admirer is male or female; one of Ravel's colleagues expressed the strong hope that the song would be sung by a woman, as it customarily is.  The song is in E major, with oscillating string motifs in the orchestral accompaniment which, in Rae's view, are reminiscent of Debussy’s Nocturnes.

Tes yeux sont doux comme ceux d’une fille,
Jeune étranger,
Et la courbe fine
De ton beau visage de duvet ombragé
Est plus séduisante encore de ligne.
Ta lèvre chante sur le pas de ma porte
Une langue inconnue et charmante
Comme une musique fausse. . .
Entre!
Et que mon vin te réconforte . . .
Mais non, tu passes
Et de mon seuil je te vois t’éloigner
Me faisant un dernier geste avec grâce,
Et la hanche légèrement ployée
Par ta démarche féminine et lasse. . . .Your eyes are soft as those of any girl,
Young stranger,
And the delicate curve
Of your fine features, shadowed with down
Is still more seductive in profile.
On my doorstep your lips sing
A language unknown and charming
Like music out of tune…
Enter!
And let my wine comfort you …
But no, you pass by
And from my doorway I watch you go on your way
Giving me a graceful farewell wave,
And your hips gently sway
In your feminine and languid gait…

Orchestration and duration
The score is orchestrated for two flutes and piccolo, two oboes and cor anglais, two clarinets, two bassoons, four French horns, two trumpets, three trombones, tuba, timpani, snare drum, bass drum, tambourine, triangle, glockenspiel, cymbals, gong, two harps, and strings.

A typical performance of the cycle takes about 15–16 minutes in total, comprising
Asie: 9–10 minutes
La flûte enchantée: about 3 minutes
L'indifférent: about    minutes.
Source: Decca 1963 and HMV 1967 recordings.

Discography
 Suzanne Danco (soprano / mezzo-soprano) and the orchestre de la Suisse Romande], conducted by Ernest Ansermet,Decca, 1955 (Remarkable for the purity of the diction)
 Régine Crespin (soprano) and the Orchestre de la Suisse Romande, conducted by Ernest Ansermet, Decca, 1963
 Janet Baker (mezzo-soprano) and the New Philharmonia Orchestra, conducted by John Barbirolli, EMI, 1968
 Jessye Norman (soprano) and the London Symphony Orchestra, conducted by Colin Davis, Philips, 1980
 Frederica von Stade (mezzo-soprano) and the Boston Symphony Orchestra, conducted by Seiji Ozawa, Columbia, 1981
 Anne Sofie von Otter (mezzo-soprano) and the Cleveland Orchestra, conducted by Pierre Boulez, Deutsche Grammophon, 2004.

Notes, references and sources

Notes

References

Sources

External links

 "Shéhérazade: ouverture de féerie" (archived on 31 March 2017 at the Wayback Machine from maurice-ravel.net)
 Shéhérazade (archived on 31 March 2017 at the Wayback Machine from maurice-ravel.net)
Performance of Shéhérazade featuring soprano Elizabeth Parcells with commentary by the singer

1903 compositions
Classical song cycles in French
Music based on One Thousand and One Nights
Song cycles by Maurice Ravel